Cerithiella bisculpta is a species of  very small sea snails, marine gastropod molluscs in the family Newtoniellidae. It was described by Strebel in 1908.

Description 
The maximum recorded shell length is 4.5 mm.

Habitat 
Minimum recorded depth is 94 m. Maximum recorded depth is 252 m.

References

Newtoniellidae
Gastropods described in 1908